Brinje is a former settlement in the Municipality of Moravče in central Slovenia. It is now part of the village of Drtija. The area is part of the traditional region of Upper Carniola. The municipality is now included in the Central Slovenia Statistical Region.

Geography
Brinje lies in the northwestern part of the village of Drtija, in a low area north of Stražca Creek. The buildings in the former settlement are administratively part of the neighboring settlement of Zalog pri Moravčah.

History
Brinje had a population of six living in one house in 1900. Brinje was annexed by Drtija in 1952, ending its existence as an independent settlement.

References

External links
Brinje on Geopedia

Populated places in the Municipality of Moravče
Former settlements in Slovenia